Artur Akavov (born 14 December 1985) is a Russian professional boxer who has challenged twice for the WBO middleweight title in 2016 and 2019.

Professional career
Akavov boxed at various European national championships as an amateur before turning professional. In May 2014, Akavov won the minor WBO European title and went on to defend it three times.

Akavov vs. Saunders 
Akavov had a record of 16-1 by 2016 and obtained a top ten ranking by the WBO, which eventually led to his opportunity to fight for a world title. The WBO middleweight champion Billy Joe Saunders was under pressure to make the first defence of the title he'd won by defeating Andy Lee almost a year previously. A hand injury to Saunders and two cancelled defences earlier in the year lead to Akavov being offered the fight, with the fight originally scheduled to take place on 22 October at the Motorpoint Arena in Cardiff. A muscle injury to Saunders then meant the fight was rescheduled for 26 November, before visa issues for Akavov caused the fight to be put back a further week to 3 December and the venue changed to the Paisley Lagoon Centre near Glasgow, Scotland.

The fight was fairly close for the first six rounds, with Saunders coming on strong for the next four rounds which seemed to tire him somewhat for the last two. Saunders claimed a unanimous decision after the full twelve rounds to retain his title, with the three judges scoring it 116-112, 116-113 and 115-113 in his favour. After the fight Saunders apologised to his fans, describing his performance as "flat" and "terrible". Many observers felt the decision could have gone either way, with the CompuBox final punch stats stating that Saunders landed 82/579 of punches to Akavov's 81/624, with both fighters outlanding the other in six rounds each.

Akavov vs. Andrade 
On 18 January, 2019, Akavov challenged for the WBO middleweight title for the second time in his career, this time against Demetrius Andrade. Andrade outboxed Akavov through most of the fight. Early in the final round, the referee decided to wave the fight off and award Andrade the TKO victory.

Akavov vs. Falcao 
On 20 February, 2021, Akavov fought Esquiva Falcao. Falcao was ranked #5 by the WBO and the IBF and #8 by the WBC at middleweight. Falcao beat Akavov by technical knockout in the 4th round.

Professional boxing record

References

External links

Artur Akavov - Profile, News Archive & Current Rankings at Box.Live

1985 births
Living people
Russian male boxers
People from Novocherkassk
Middleweight boxers
Sportspeople from Rostov Oblast
21st-century Russian people